Dague was one of a dozen s built for the French Navy in the first decade of the 20th century. Completed in 1912, the ship was initially assigned to the 1st Naval Army in the Mediterranean Sea. During the First World War, she escorted the battle fleet during the Battle of Antivari off the coast of Montenegro in August 1914 and escorted multiple convoys to Montenegro over the next six months. Dague struck a mine in Antivari harbor in February 1915 and sank with the loss of 38 crewmen.

Design and description

The Boucliers were the first class of destroyers designed in response to a new doctrine for their use. Nearly double the size of previous classes and more powerfully armed, they were built to a general specification and each shipyard was allowed to determine the best way to meet that specification. Their crew numbered 4 officers and 77–84 men.

The sisters were powered by a pair of Breguet steam turbines, each driving one propeller shaft using steam provided by four du Temple boilers.

The primary armament of the Bouclier-class ships consisted of two  Modèle 1893 guns in single mounts, one each fore and aft of the superstructure, and four  Modèle 1902 guns distributed amidships. They were also fitted with two twin mounts for  torpedo tubes amidships, one on each broadside.

Construction and career
Dague was ordered on 26 August 1908 as part of the 1908 naval program from C.A. Gironde. She was laid down at the company's shipyard at Lormont near Bordeaux on the Gironde estuary in 1910. The ship was launched on 27 June 1911 and began her sea trials on 20 February 1912. Dague was commissioned on 20 May 1912 and was assigned to the 1st Destroyer Flotilla of the 1st Naval Army in the Mediterranean. Shortly after the start of the First World War, the flotilla escorted the battle fleet during the Battle of Antivari on 16 August and when they bombarded the Austro-Hungarian naval base at Cattaro, Montenegro, on 1 September. Four days later, the fleet covered the evacuation of Danilo, Crown Prince of Montenegro, to the Greek island of Corfu. The flotilla escorted multiple small convoys loaded with supplies and equipment to Antivari (now known as Bar), Montenegro, beginning in October and lasting for the rest of the year, always covered by the larger ships of the Naval Army in futile attempts to lure the Austro-Hungarian fleet into battle.

The first convoy of 1915 to Antivari arrived on 11 January and was followed by two others in over the next few weeks. An Austro-Hungarian force of one destroyer and two torpedo boats bombarded Antivari on 14 February and were able to lay some mines in the harbor. That same day Dague ferried General Paul Pau to Athens, Greece, for consultations with the Greek government. Dague and her sister  were the close escort for the two transports of the next convoy that arrived on 23 February. The following evening, Dague was struck by a drifting mine in the harbor while at anchor and broke in half with the loss of 38 crewmen. The ship was struck from the navy list on 25 February.

The ship's wreck lay undisturbed until expansion of the harbor facilities in 1973 forced its removal. The wreck was cut into five pieces and moved to its current location, except for the stern.

References

Bibliography

 

Bouclier-class destroyers
Ships built in France
1911 ships
Maritime incidents in 1915
Ships sunk by mines
World War I shipwrecks in the Adriatic Sea